Deinostema is a genus of flowering plants belonging to the family Plantaginaceae.

Its native range is Southern Russian Far East to Northern and Eastern China, Temperate Eastern Asia.

Species:

Deinostema adenocaula 
Deinostema violacea

References

Plantaginaceae
Plantaginaceae genera